Rush Lake is a lake located in Rush Lake and Otto Townships in Otter Tail County, Minnesota.

Size and Shape

Location
Rush lake is located to the north of Buchanan Lake, and to the northeast of the much larger Otter Tail Lake.

References 

Lakes of Otter Tail County, Minnesota
Lakes of Minnesota